Last Love (German: Letzte Liebe) is a 1935 Austrian drama film directed by Fritz Schulz and starring Albert Bassermann, Michiko Tanaka and Elsa Bassermann.

The film's sets were designed by the art directors Artur Berger, Alfred Kunz and Emil Stepanek. It was shot at the Rosenhügel Studios in Vienna.

Cast
Albert Bassermann as Thomas Bruck  
Michiko Tanaka as Namiko Sanada, Japanese musical student
Elsa Bassermann as Hanna von Hooven
Hans Jaray as Walter, their son
Hans Homma as Director of the Vienna Opera
Fritz Imhoff as the host
Oskar Karlweis as Teddy Langhammer
Karl Paryla as Franz  
Etha von Storm as Susi Spangenberg  
Wiener Philharmoniker as Themselves - Orchestra

Reception
Writing for The Spectator in 1935, Graham Greene reviewed the film favorably, describing it as having "a pleasant unpretentious air of truth about it", and suggesting to readers that "once accept the romantic plot and the rest is genuine: a creative career from a professional angle". Green praised the acting of Albert Bassermann and the "charming voice" of Michiko Meini.

References

External links

Austrian drama films
1935 drama films
Films directed by Fritz Schulz
Films about classical music and musicians
Films about composers
Films about interracial romance
Films about teacher–student relationships
Films set in universities and colleges
Films shot at Rosenhügel Studios
Austrian black-and-white films
1930s German-language films